Jesse Boulerice (born August 10, 1978) is an American former professional ice hockey forward. Primarily playing in an enforcing role, Boulerice played the majority of his National Hockey League (NHL) career for the Carolina Hurricanes.

Background 
Boulerice was born in Plattsburgh, NY, located about 25 miles south of Canada. In addition to working on his family's farm, young Boulerice loved playing hockey, leading to his father building a rink in their backyard. He played in the World Juniors with Team USA, winning a silver medal in 1997. As a junior, he also spent three years playing with Detroit and Plymouth of the Ontario Hockey League.

Playing career
Boulerice was drafted by the Philadelphia Flyers in the 1996 NHL Entry Draft, 133rd overall. He has played for the Carolina Hurricanes, St. Louis Blues and Flyers. He was charged with assault in 1998 while playing with the Plymouth Whalers of the Ontario Hockey League (OHL) after a violent stick-swinging incident with Guelph Storm forward Andrew Long.

Boulerice is known for being the victim of an Aaron Downey left hook on February 11, 2003, after failing to land the first punch, which left Boulerice with a broken jaw and a concussion. Boulerice spent the night in the hospital as his Carolina Hurricanes lost in overtime to the Dallas Stars, 2–1.

Boulerice's role as an enforcer was reduced later in his career due to the NHL's stricter penalties for instigating a fight, by a $10,000 fine to the coach if it occurs in the final five minutes of a game.

On October 10, 2007, Boulerice delivered a cross-check to the face of Vancouver Canucks forward Ryan Kesler, with his team up 7–2 in the third period. Boulerice received a 25-game suspension as disciplinary action from the league, which is tied for the fourth-longest suspension for an on-ice incident in modern NHL history.

Boulerice started the 2008–09 season with the Lake Erie Monsters of the American Hockey League (AHL). On November 11, 2008, he signed a contract with the Colorado Avalanche and while being reassigned to the Monsters, was claimed off waivers by the Edmonton Oilers. After playing only two games with the Oilers, Boulerice was placed on waivers again, and was re-claimed by the Avalanche on November 21, 2008.

Boulerice was invited to the AHL's Wilkes-Barre/Scranton Penguins training camp for the 2009–10 season. He made his presence felt and remained to sign a one-year contract with the Penguins on October 3, 2009. In 54 games with Wilkes-Barre, Boulerice tied his AHL career high with four goals and led the team with 124 penalty minutes. On July 29, 2010, he re-signed with the Penguins to another one-year deal. On January 7, 2011, Boulerice was suspended for 10 games for deliberately running over an AHL referee.

Personal life 
After retiring from professional hockey in 2011, Boulerice became a financial advisor with Merrill-Lynch's office in Raleigh, NC. He lives in Raleigh with his wife Cailin and three children. He coaches youth hockey and serves on the board of the Raleigh Youth Hockey Association.

Career statistics

Regular season and playoffs

International

References

External links
 

1978 births
Albany River Rats players
American men's ice hockey right wingers
Carolina Hurricanes players
Detroit Whalers players
Edmonton Oilers players
Lake Erie Monsters players
Living people
Lowell Lock Monsters players
New Orleans Brass players
People from Rouses Point, New York
Philadelphia Flyers draft picks
Philadelphia Flyers players
Philadelphia Phantoms players
Plymouth Whalers players
St. Louis Blues players
Trenton Titans players
Wilkes-Barre/Scranton Penguins players
Ice hockey players from New York (state)